Vieux is a commune in the Tarn department in southern France.

Geography
The village lies in the southern part of the commune, on the right bank of the Vère, which flows westward through the commune.

See also
Communes of the Tarn department

References

Communes of Tarn (department)